Gastón Nicolás Verón (born 23 April 2001) is an Argentine footballer currently playing as a forward for Argentinos Juniors.

Career statistics

Club

Notes

References

2001 births
Living people
Argentine footballers
Association football forwards
Argentine Primera División players
Primera Nacional players
Argentinos Juniors footballers
Estudiantes de Buenos Aires footballers
Sportspeople from Chaco Province